Football boots, called cleats or soccer shoes in North America, are an item of footwear worn when playing association football. Those designed for grass pitches have studs on the outsole to aid grip. From simple and humble beginnings football boots have come a long way and today find themselves subject to much research, development, sponsorship and marketing at the heart of a multi-national global industry. Modern "boots" are no longer truly boots in that they do not cover the ankle - like most other types of specialist athletic footwear, their basic design and appearance has converged with that of sneakers since the 1960s.

In addition to association football, they are often worn for rugby union and rugby league in preference to dedicated rugby boots by players in specific positions. Football boots are often worn for other sports that are played on grass surfaces, such as Lacrosse, hurling, shinty, quiddich and even tug of war.

History 

1800s: During the 19th century football became extremely popular in Great Britain. People who played would wear their heavy and hard work boots to play. These were the first ever boots with the steel toe cap at the front, long laces and high topped. These boots also had metal studs or tacks put on the bottom so the players would have more grip and stability.

1900–1940: During this period the style of football boots stayed very basic. They remained so during the inter-war years, despite many famous football boot producers, such as Gola, Hummel and Valsport becoming ever more popular.

1940–1960: After the Second World War, the designs of the football boot changed dramatically. The South Americans first wore lighter and more flexibles boots, which later came into the attention of the world. This design was focused on increasing good control and better kicking power rather than a more protective boot. In 1954 Adi Dassler introduced screw-in studs which gave the German team a tangible advantage during a rain-lashed World Cup that year. That Dassler was the first to come up with screw-in studs is disputed by his older brother, Rudolf Dassler, founder of Puma.

1960s: In the 1960s many football boots were designed with a lower cut and were designed to be lighter and more flexible. These enabled the best players in Europe and South America to move faster and change direction quicker. Mitre, Joma and Asics joined the fray. Adidas became the top manufacturer during this decade, with 75% of players at the 1966 FIFA World Cup wearing Adidas.

1970s: The 1970s saw many large advances and changes in the football boot design. These included lighter boots and a variety of colours. Boot sponsorship also became more widespread. Adidas was the market leader in this period, releasing new technologies such as padding to provide heel protection. At the end of the decade, in 1979, it cemented its status by releasing what has gone on to become the best selling boot of all time, the Copa Mundial. During this time period, some of the most common types of natural leather came into production: kangaroo leather, calfskin and full-grain/cow leather. Diadora entered the market in this decade.

1980s: The 1980s saw further advancement of the technological advances of the football boot in the 1970s. Umbro, Lotto and Kelme joined the market in this decade.

1990s: New types of sole were introduced to increase the balance of the player. The Adidas Predator, designed by Australian Craig Johnston in the late 1980s, was released in 1994 and enjoyed instant success. Mizuno, Reebok, Uhlsport, and Nike began making football boots in this decade. Nike's first boot, the Nike Mercurial Vapor, immediately made an impact on its release in 1998 and after Ronaldo wore them at the 1998 FIFA World Cup.

2000s: In the first decade of the 21st century laser technology was introduced to produce the first fully customised football boot in 2006. The first laceless boot, the Lotto Zhero Gravity, was also released in 2006. Laceless boots later became very popular in the late 2010s.

2010s: In the era of the modern game that sees the tempo of matches becoming faster and players more technically inclined, manufacturers introduce new advances in technology including lighter footwear made from alternative materials. Boot customisation also became more prominent with the rise of the internet. Laceless boots became very popular after Adidas released the Ace PureControl in 2016.

Material for soccer cleats 
Soccer cleats are an essential part of a player's equipment. They are designed to provide traction on the field and grip the ground in order to avoid slipping and sliding. Soccer cleats can be made from many different materials such as rubber, synthetic such as nylon and polyurethane, or leather. The most popular material for soccer cleats is kangaroo leather. Kangaroo leather is a type of leather that is made from the skin of a kangaroo. It has a unique texture and it's very durable. It's also breathable and lightweight, which makes it perfect for soccer players who need to be agile on the field. Some players prefer leather while others like synthetic or plastic material because they are more durable and cheaper.

Different styles for different sports 

Depending on the type of surface, kind of sport and even the wearer's position or role in the game, different styles of boot and particularly stud configurations are available. For hard pitches, amateur participants may wear a sneaker shoe or a plastic-stud boot (known as a "moulded sole" or "firm ground" boot); in most sports and positions this is adequate, although on a well-grassed or sodden field, screw-in studs are recommended for more grip; these may be metal, rubber or plastic and are called "soft ground" boots. When playing on this kind of pitch, some players favor using a boot with screw-in studs in their non-dominant (supporting) foot to provide grip, and a boot with short rubber or plastic studs in the dominant (kicking/passing) foot to provide accuracy. However, most players opt for a consistent configuration on both boots.

For indoor football, indoor boots are used. These come with rubber soles, meant to maximize grip on the floor. Some are built on the design of firm-ground football boots, and some are specifically designed for the indoor game. For football on turf or artificial grass, some players wear regular firm ground football boots. But wearing regular football boots on turf greatly reduces the life of the boot, so companies such as Nike have developed football boots for artificial grass (AG), which have smaller circular studs.

For rugby union, the screw-in stud is preferred, especially in the positions of prop, hooker, and lock, where more grip is required for contested scrums. These screw-in studs have to be of a maximum length of 21 mm. These boots are often heavier than appropriate for other types of football. One of the more obvious differences between association football and rugby boots is the formation of the studs - rugby boots typically have no fewer than nine studs whilst those worn for soccer can have a minimum of six.  Also, some rugby boots tend to have a high cut around the ankles but this type is becoming less popular, especially at elite level. There are several types of rugby boot, meant for players in different positions.

Screw-in studs have been banned in some Australian rules football leagues since the 1990s due to the frequency of severe injuries to players as a result of contact with the metal. In football, referees must now check all boots prior to kick off to check for damage to studs, to prevent injury. Before this time, preference between the screw-in stud was based primarily on weather conditions.

More recently, moulded soles with specially designed boots known as blades have moulded soles facing in multiple directions, theoretically to maximise grip and minimise ankle injury. Recently, however, "bladed" football boots have faced criticism from some UK sporting bodies for causing potentially serious injuries to players. English football club Manchester United have even banned their players from wearing boots with bladed studs after players like Wayne Rooney and David Beckham suffered repeated metatarsal injuries.

Football markets and brands  

Originally, football boots were available only in black, but recently, they have become available in various colours such as blue, green, red, white, yellow, silver, gold and even pink. Big name companies such as Nike, Adidas, Puma and the like have made an impact on the market with record sales. Nike's flagship shoes are the Phantom VNM, Phantom VSN, Tiempos and The Nike Mercurial  Vapor worn by Cristiano Ronaldo and others. German company Adidas are responsible for the Predator range worn by David Beckham, Gary Neville, and Steven Gerrard, as well as the long-surviving Copa Mundial. The entire German national side wore Adidas boots during the 2006 FIFA World Cup. Another German firm Puma flagship shoes are the Puma King Platinum, Puma Future and Puma One worn by Sergio Agüero, Marco Reus, Cesc Fàbregas and Antoine Griezmann.

The Puma King boots have been worn by legendary players such as Pelé, Eusébio, Johan Cruyff and Diego Maradona.

In recent times, the most successful companies are Nike and Adidas, and their products enjoy great popularity among professional footballers; among Nike's endorsers are two-time FIFA World Player of the Year Ronaldinho, aforementioned duo Wayne Rooney and Cristiano Ronaldo, Brazilian striker Ronaldo, Wesley Sneijder, Zlatan Ibrahimović, and other popular players. Adidas, which has been providing football boots with screw-in studs to the Germany national football team since the 1954 FIFA World Cup, have made their impact on the modern market by signing big name players as endorsers: players such as David Beckham, former France captain Zinedine Zidane, Frank Lampard, six-time world player of the year Lionel Messi, David Villa, and Steven Gerrard. Puma has also made a significant impact in the industry by signing big names such as World Cup winners Antoine Griezmann, Marco Reus, and Gianluigi Buffon, David Silva, Cesc Fàbregas, Romelu Lukaku, Mario Balotelli, and Champions League winner Luis Suárez.

Customization 
Many players use personalisation around the world to improve the look of their boots and to make them easily identifiable in the club dressing room. It is now very common to have football boots fully personalised with either a name, initials, number or club logo. Professional players such as Lionel Messi, Cristiano Ronaldo, and Neymar have all personalised their boots in some way, either by including their number, the names of their children, or just a flag. Many retailers offer various options and colours to personalise football boots by using the embroidery machinery, such as Nike, Adidas, and Puma.

See also 
 Cleat
 Comparison of orthotics

Bibliography

References 

 
Boot
Boot
Boot
Sports footwear